FKI may refer to:

 FKi 1st, Artist
 FKi (production team), an American record production team
 Bangoka International Airport, in Kisangani, Democratic Republic of the Congo
 Free Knowledge Institute, a Dutch open software organization
 FKI (company), a former British manufacturing company
 Föreningen för Kanot-Idrott (Stockholm Canoe Club), Sweden's oldest canoe club